Libra generally refers to:

 Libra (constellation), a constellation
 Libra (astrology), an astrological sign based on the star constellation

Libra may also refer to:

Arts and entertainment
 Libra (novel), a 1988 novel by Don DeLillo

Music
 Libra (Gary Bartz album), 1968
 Libra (Julio Iglesias album), 1985  
 Libra (Lali album), 2020
 Libra (Toni Braxton album), 2005
 The L.I.B.R.A., 2020 album by T.I.

Fictional entities
 Libra Dohko, a manga Saint Seiya character
 Libra (Marvel Comics), Gustav Brandt, the character most commonly associated with the name
 Libra (DC Comics), a DC Comics villain who is one of the leading characters in Final Crisis

Organizations
 Libra Association, an oversight body for the digital currency Diem
 Libra Group, a multinational conglomerate business based in New York and London
 LIBRA, a former Croatian liberal democratic political party that is now part of the Croatian People's Party – Liberal Democrats
 Libra Foundation, a charitable organization in Maine, US

Science and technology
 Libra (skipper), a genus of skippers in the family Hesperiidae
 Libra (Academic Search), a public search engine for academic papers and literature
 Libra (weight), an ancient Roman unit of weight
 Carolingian pound, a unit of weight and coinage based on the Roman unit
 The former name of Diem (digital currency), a cryptocurrency project initiated by Facebook
 Libra (Chinese astronomy)

Other uses
 Libra oil field, a giant oil field off the coast of Brazil
 Libra, the brand name in Australia of Libresse feminine hygiene products

See also
 Libras (Língua Brasileira de Sinais) or Brazilian Sign Language
 Libre (disambiguation)